This national electoral calendar for 2020 lists the national/federal elections held in 2020 in all sovereign states and their dependent territories. By-elections are excluded, though national referendums are included.

January
5 January: 
Croatia, President (2nd round)
Uzbekistan, Legislative Chamber (2nd round)
9 January: Sint Maarten, Legislature
11 January: Taiwan, President and Parliament
19 January: Comoros, Parliament (1st round)
23 January: Tokelau, Legislature
26 January: Peru, Parliament

February
8 February: Ireland, Assembly
9 February: 
Azerbaijan, Parliament
Cameroon, National Assembly
Switzerland, Referendums
21 February: Iran, Parliament (1st round)
22 February: Togo, President
23 February: Comoros, Parliament (2nd round)
29 February: Slovakia, Parliament

March
1 March: Tajikistan, Assembly of Representatives
2 March: 
Guyana, President and Parliament
Israel, Parliament
19 March: Vanuatu, Parliament
22 March: 
Abkhazia, President
Guinea, Parliament and Constitutional Referendum
29 March: Mali, Parliament (1st round)
31 March: Artsakh, President (1st round) and Parliament

April
14 April: 
Artsakh, President (2nd round)
Kiribati, Parliament (1st round)
15 April: South Korea, Parliament
19 April: Mali, Parliament (2nd round)
21 April: Kiribati, Parliament (2nd round)

May
1 May: Palau, Constitutional Referendum
20 May: Burundi, President and National Assembly
25 May: Suriname, Parliament
30 May: Niue, Legislature

June
5 June: Saint Kitts and Nevis, Parliament
21 June: Serbia, Parliament
22 June: Kiribati, President
23 June: Malawi, President
24 June: Mongolia, Parliament
25 June – 1 July: Russia, Constitutional Referendum
27 June: Iceland, President
28 June: Poland, President (1st round)
29 June: Anguilla, Legislature

July
5 July: 
Croatia, Parliament
Dominican Republic, President, Chamber of Deputies and Senate
10 July: Singapore, Parliament
12 July: Poland, President (2nd round)
15 July: North Macedonia, Parliament
19 July: Syria, Parliament

August
5 August: Sri Lanka, Parliament
9 August: Belarus, President
10 August: Trinidad and Tobago, House of Representatives
11–12 August: Egypt, Senate (1st round)
30 August: 
Liechtenstein, Referendums
Montenegro, Parliament

September
3 September: Jamaica, House of Representatives
8–9 September: Egypt, Senate (2nd round)
11 September: Iran, Parliament (2nd round)
20–21 September: Italy, Constitutional Referendum
24 September: Falkland Islands, Referendum
27 September: Switzerland, Referendums

October
1 October: Bermuda, House of Assembly
2–3 October: Czech Republic, Senate (1st round)
4 October: 
Kyrgyzstan, Parliament (election nullified)
New Caledonia, Independence Referendum
7 October: Guernsey, Legislature
9–10 October: Czech Republic, Senate (2nd round)
11 October: 
Lithuania, Parliament (1st round)
Northern Cyprus, President (1st round) and Constitutional Referendum
Tajikistan, President
17 October: New Zealand, Parliament and Referendums on cannabis and euthanasia
18 October: 
Bolivia, President, Chamber of Deputies and Senate
Guinea, President
Northern Cyprus, President (2nd round)
22–24 October: Seychelles, President and Parliament
24–25 October: Egypt, House of Representatives (1st round, 1st phase)
25 October: 
Chile, Referendum
Lithuania, Parliament (2nd round)
28 October: Tanzania, President and Parliament
31 October: 
Georgia, Parliament (1st round)
Ivory Coast, President

November
1 November: 
Algeria, Constitutional Referendum
Moldova, President (1st round)
3 November: 
Palau, President, House of Delegates and Senate
United States, President, House of Representatives and Senate
American Samoa, Governor and House of Representatives
Guam, Auditor, Consolidated Commission on Utilities, Education Board, Legislature, and Supreme Court and Superior Court retention elections
Northern Mariana Islands, House of Representatives, Senate, and Supreme Court retention elections
Puerto Rico, Governor, House of Representatives, Senate and Referendum
U.S. Virgin Islands, Board of Education, Board of Elections, Legislature and Referendum
5 November: Saint Vincent and the Grenadines, Parliament
7–8 November: Egypt, House of Representatives (1st round, 2nd phase)
8 November: Myanmar, House of Representatives and House of Nationalities
10 November: Jordan, House of Representatives
11 November: Belize, House of Representatives
15 November: Moldova, President (2nd round)
21 November: Georgia, Parliament (2nd round)
22 November: Burkina Faso, President and Parliament
23–24 November: Egypt, House of Representatives (2nd round, 1st phase)
29 November: 
Switzerland, Referendums
Transnistria, Parliament

December
5 December: Kuwait, Parliament
6 December: 
Romania, Chamber of Deputies and Senate
Venezuela, National Assembly
7 December: Ghana, President and Parliament
7–8 December: Egypt, House of Representatives (2nd round, 2nd phase)
8 December: Liberia, Senate and Constitutional Referendum
27 December: 
Central African Republic, President and Parliament (1st round)
Niger, President (1st round) and Parliament

Indirect elections
The following indirect elections of heads of state and the upper houses of bicameral legislatures took place through votes in elected lower houses, unicameral legislatures, or electoral colleges: 
6 January: Marshall Islands, 
16–17 January: Uzbekistan, Senate
22 January: Greece, President
23 January: Nepal, National Assembly
17 February and 24 November: Austria, Federal Council
12 March: Isle of Man, Legislative Council
26 March, 19 June and 2 November: India, Council of States
27 March: Tajikistan, 
30–31 March: Ireland, Senate
1 April: San Marino, Captains Regent
11 May, 10 and 25 August, 13 September, 10 November and 10 December: Malaysia, Senate
13 July: Suriname, 
20 July: Burundi, 
12 August: Kazakhstan, Senate
27 September: France, Senate
1 October: San Marino, Captains Regent
25 November: Namibia, National Council
11 December: Madagascar,

See also
 2020 in politics and government

External links
 IFES Election Guide – Elections
 National Democratic Institute – Electoral Calendar

References 

National
National
Political timelines of the 2020s by year
National